Jan Franciszek Czarnowski (1883–1963) was a Polish nobleman of Grabie coat of arms who was Papal chamberlain to Pope Pius XI, and head of the Polish Priory of the Order of the Knights of Malta. He was married to Helena (Lunia) Kalinowska, and owned the Rossocha estate, where he commissioned a palace, built by Juliusz Nagórski.

References
 
 
 
  Jan Franciszek Czarnowski z Czarnowa h. Grabie

Papal chamberlains
Knights of Malta
1883 births
1963 deaths